St Peters Lutheran College (SPLC) is a Lutheran co-educational private school in Queensland, Australia with teaching campuses in Indooroopilly and Springfield, and an outdoor education centre in Crows Nest. The college provides prep to year 12 education, with domestic day schooling at Springfield, with domestic and international day and boarding at the larger Indooroopilly campus. In year 9, students spend five-weeks completing the Ironbark Outdoor Education Program at the outdoor education centre in Crows Nest.

The college was founded in 1945 with the initial purchase of Ross Roy House, later expanding through neighbouring properties and the opening of the Springfield campus in 2008. Both Ross Roy and the chapel have been listed in the Queensland Heritage Register since 2012.

In 2017, St Peters had an enrolment of 1986 students with a teaching staff of 183 teachers with 182 non-teaching staff.

Symbolism 

There are certain symbolic icons present in the college emblem, including Martin Luther's iconic white rose from his seal, and an inverted cross for St Peter, leader of the Apostles in the early Christian Church, who was crucified upside-down.

The School's motto, Plus Ultra, which is Latin for "Ever Higher", is said to emphasise the college's desire for the students to reach their goals in their learning.

Campus 

Starting with the 1897 Villa "Ross Roy", bought and used as the first building of St Peters in 1945, the college campus has seen significant growth and change over the years.

Theile house, a four-storey building comprising computer labs, classrooms, Year 11/12 lockers, and the Theile study centre, was recently renovated and extended. The facilities in the new building include a study centre for students in years 11 and 12, with three private study/meeting rooms and numerous computers and laptops available to students. The girls' boarding houses have also been renovated, now featuring air conditioning, and a multi-purpose court.

There are three libraries on campus. The Senior School library is a three-storey facility where students and staff can access a collection of fiction and non-fiction. There are approximately 80 computers and students have access to a number of databases to which the school subscribes.

In 2013, a Performing Arts Centre was also opened. This is a three-storey facility including an auditorium, theatrette, orchestra and band rooms, music and drama classrooms, and rooms for instrumental tuition and practice.

Ironbark 

Ironbark is the outdoor campus of St Peters Lutheran College. The donation of land in 1971, provided the College with an opportunity to develop and implement an outdoor education program. After several years of discussion and planning, a pilot program was run in 1974. Following the success of the pilot program, Ironbark has been part of the College curriculum since 1976. Ironbark was named for the Eucalyptus Crebra, the narrow leaf Ironbark, which grows across the property.

Heads of College 
The heads of college have been:

Curriculum 
The St Peters curriculum is designed to provide a continuum of experience and knowledge acquisition from Prep to Year 12. To this end, St Peters offers programs within four separate sub-schools: Lower Primary (P–4), Upper Primary (5–6), Junior High (7–9) and Senior School (10–12). Each sub-school operates semi-autonomously with its own Head of Sub-School and administration. The Senior School offers the International Baccalaureate Diploma Program.

Since 2004, the school has run an exchange program in conjunction with sister school, Immanuel college, in Adelaide, South Australia. The focus of the exchange program, or "Mind Change" as it is known, is to allow gifted students from both schools a chance to meet students their age who they can relate their interests to.

Sport 
St Peters Lutheran College is a member of the Associated Independent Colleges (AIC).

AIC premierships 
St Peters Lutheran College has won the following AIC premierships.

 Basketball - 2007
 Rugby (2) - 2000, 2012
 Soccer (2) - 2014, 2020
 Swimming (9) - 1999, 2000, 2012, 2014, 2017, 2018, 2019, 2020, 2021, 2022
 Tennis (9) - 1999, 2013, 2014, 2015, 2016, 2017, 2018, 2019, 2020
 Volleyball (3) - 2012, 2013, 2014

Publications 
The school has a number of publications that are made available to the school community, including:
The Rock, the Indooroopilly school's weekly newsletter
Cornerstone, the Springfield school's weekly newsletter
Pebbles, a publication for the primary years
Plus Ultra, a magazine printed three times a year
The Review, an annual publication reviewing the previous year
Maroon and White, a publication circulated to boarding families

Chapel

The St Peters Lutheran College Chapel was built in 1968 to a design of the Austrian-born architect Karl Langer. Langer's work was in a distinctive sub-tropical modernist style and was his last built project. The building has a large well-lit nave with a choir loft, vestry, and meditation chapel and features a large bell tower. It is constructed of load-bearing face brick with a roof of flat metal sheeting.

History
St Peters Lutheran College was established at Indooroopilly by the Lutheran Church in 1945 with 56 boarding students. Ross Roy was the main building and focus for early college life with Luther House built by voluntary labour soon after the college's commencement. St Peters has had five heads in its history and is the largest Lutheran school in Australia, today, with an enrolment maintained at approximately 2000 day and boarding students and 350 teaching and non-teaching staff. The boarding enrolments are maintained at 150 students. St Peters Lutheran College – Ironbark Outdoor Education Centre, via Crows Nest, was established in 1974 as a trial program and in 1976 as an ongoing outdoor dducation program. This life changing experience is a five-week program for Year 9 students and indicates St Peters positive and strong commitment to ‘growing’ our Junior High students in significant ways. The ‘Ironbark Experience’ is seen by staff, parents and students as a vital part of the St Peters journey, fostering independence, resilience, teamwork, problem solving, ethical decision making, sustainability and environmental awareness in our young people. Commencing in 2008, St Peters Lutheran College Springfield began as a Prep to Year 8 school. It now caters for Prep to Year 12 and provides the Springfield and adjacent communities with the many benefits of the St Peters journey. All St Peters schools operate under the control of the St Peters Lutheran College Council and Head of College, governed by the Lutheran Church of Australia Queensland District.

Alumni

Alumni of St. Peters Lutheran College are known as Old Scholars. All students graduate as Life Members of the St Peters Old Scholars Association (SPOSA). Notable St. Peter's Old Scholars include North Queensland indigenous leader, Noel Pearson, Olympic athletes Dane Bird-Smith, Maxine Seear, Georgia Bohl, Chris Noffke, Shane Gould, Ariarne Titmus and Pita Taufatofua, and musicians and actors Sigrid Thornton, Hamish Prasad, Craig Horner, and Sam Atwell.

Other well-known past students include ex-Brisbane Lions (now Essendon) Australian football player Mal Michael; 1986 Commonwealth Games 1500m Freestyle Gold Medallist Jason Plummer, Federal MHRs Steven Ciobo and Michael Johnson; TV sports reporter Stephanie Brantz; romance novelist and former Brisbane Broncos cheerleader Ally Blake; singer and member of South Korean K-pop group ENHYPEN Jake Sim, and current Brisbane Lions rookie listed Australian football player Adam Spackman.

See also
List of schools in Queensland

References

External links 

Lutheran Education Australia

Private secondary schools in Brisbane
Boarding schools in Queensland
Lutheran schools in Australia
Educational institutions established in 1945
Junior School Heads Association of Australia Member Schools
International Baccalaureate schools in Australia
1945 establishments in Australia
High schools and secondary schools affiliated with the Lutheran Church
Private primary schools in Brisbane
Elementary and primary schools affiliated with the Lutheran Church